Ciao Bella ("Hi/Bye Beautiful", in the Italian language) may refer to:

Ciao Bella (TV series), Canadian television sitcom set in Montreal and broadcast on CBC Television in the 2004-05
Ciao Bella (film), 2007 film directed by Mani Maserrat Agah
Ciao Bella!, alternative title for the American reality television series The Simple Life 
"Ciao Bella" (song), Don Omar song
"Ciao Bella", DJ Hamida song featuring Lartiste from DJ Hamida album Mix party 2018
"Ciao Bella", Madonna song from the album Madame X
Ciao Bella Gelato Company, American Italian company specializing in gelatos and sorbets

See also
"Bella ciao", Italian anti-fascist song